The  was one of the six schools of  Buddhism introduced to Japan during the Asuka and Nara periods.

A Sarvastivada school, Kusha-shū focused on abhidharma analysis based on the "Commentary on the " by the fourth-century Gandharan philosopher Vasubandhu. The school takes its name from that authoritative text.

Names commonly associated with the Kusha-shū are Dōshō (道昭 638–700), Joe (644–714), Chitsū (智通 ?–?), Chitatsu (智達 ?–?), and Genbō (玄昉 ?–746).

See also
Buddhism in Japan

References

Bibliography
  

Defunct schools of Buddhism in Japan
Buddhism in the Nara period